
Bastion is a restaurant (also described as a wine bar-cum-bistro) in Kinsale, County Cork, Ireland. It was awarded a Michelin star for 2020.

History
Opened in 2015 by couple Paul McDonald and Helen Noonan, The Irish Examiner wrote "calling a relatively new restaurant Bastion in a resort town where there’s an enticing menu on almost every third doorway is a little statement of intent, challengers announcing their arrival as it were." Bastion won a Michelin star in 2020.

Awards
 Michelin star: since 2020
Bib Gourmand: 2016

See also
List of Michelin starred restaurants in Ireland

References

External links
Official Site

Culture in County Cork
Michelin Guide starred restaurants in Ireland
Kinsale
Irish companies established in 2015